Juan Aponte (born 18 May 1992) is a Bolivian professional footballer who plays for in the Bolivian Primera División.

On March 23, 2017 he started a 2018 FIFA World Cup away qualification game for the Bolivia national football team against Colombia.

References

1992 births
Living people
Bolivian footballers
Association football midfielders
Bolivia international footballers
Nacional Potosí players
C.D. Jorge Wilstermann players